Glinny Mys is a rural locality (a village) in Fedkovskoye Rural Settlement of Verkhnetoyemsky District, Arkhangelsk Oblast, Russia. The population was 17 as of 2010.

Geography 
Glinny Mys is located on the Severnaya Dvina River, 37 km south of Verkhnyaya Toyma (the district's administrative centre) by road. Borki is the nearest rural locality.

References 

Rural localities in Verkhnetoyemsky District